Patania crocealis is a species of moth in the family Crambidae. It is found in France.

Taxonomy
The species was previously listed as a synonym of Patania balteata.

References

Moths described in 1834
Moths of Europe
Spilomelinae
Taxa named by Philogène Auguste Joseph Duponchel